The Top Bet ( Literal translation: Queen of Gambling) is a 1991 Hong Kong comedy film directed by Jeffrey Lau and Corey Yuen and starring Carol Cheng, Anita Mui and Ng Man-tat. It is a sequel to Lau and Yuen's 1990 film All for the Winner.

Synopsis
After Sing (Stephen Chow) uses his special powers to beat Hung Kwong (Paul Chun) in the Gambling King Competition, his elder sister Mei (Anita Mui) is ordered by the Special Power Clan in Mainland China to bring him back as he is not supposed to use his special powers for gambling. Meanwhile, Sing is on a world tour and Mei cannot find him in their Uncle's (Ng Man-tat) home. In the meantime, Sing's ex-Taiwanese boss Chan Chung (Jeffrey Lau) is looking for him to represent Taiwan again in another upcoming world gambling competition. Since he cannot be found, his Uncle is at his wit's end to find someone with similar powers to replace him. Whence, comes a rescuer in the form of a local female gambler by the name of Fanny (Carol Cheng), a.k.a. Queen of Gambling, at a fish market. But in reality, she is no more than a con artist fooling her fellow fishmongers. Fanny decides to pretend to have special powers because she needs a large sum of money to cure her younger brother's illness.

Cast
 Anita Mui as Mei, Sing's elder sister
 Carol Dodo Cheng as Fanny/Queen of Gambling
 Ng Man-tat as Blackie Tat/Sam Suk (3rd uncle)
 Sandra Ng as Ping
 Lowell Lo as Tai
 Paul Chun as Hung Kwong
 Jeffrey Lau as Chan Chung
 Corey Yuen as Fishy Shing
 Kenny Bee as Bee
 Bowie Wu as referee at gambling competition
 Shing Fui-On as Brother Shaw/male voice of Aunty Luk
 Dion Lam Dik-On as Kwong's hired killer
 Yuen Wah as Sifu Wu Lung Lo (cameo)
 Stephen Chow as Sing (cameo)
 Sharla Cheung Man (cameo; archive footage)
 Angelina Lo as Aunty Luk
 Lau Shun as Yim Chun
 Elaine Law Suet-Ling as fat lady reporter
 Sze Mei-Yee as Competition commentator
 Lo Hung as Fanny's 1st competitor
 Hoh Dung as Brother Shaw's man
 Jameson Lam Wa-Fan as Chung's bodyguard
 So Wai-Nam as Chung's bodyguard
 Dickens Chan Wing-Chung as Tony
 Wong Ying-Kit as doctor
 Fruit Chan Goh as spectator
 Rico Chu Tak-On as manager of Dominic Saloon
 Hui Sze-Man as customer of Dominic Saloon
 Chan Ging as robber at Dominic Saloon
 Lee Ying-Git as robber
 Alexander Chan Mong-Wah as gambler
 Benny Tse Chi-Wah as ice-cream seller

References

External links

The Top Bet at Hong Kong Cinemagic

1991 films
1991 comedy films
Films about gambling
Hong Kong sequel films
Hong Kong slapstick comedy films
1990s Cantonese-language films
Films directed by Jeffrey Lau
Films directed by Corey Yuen
Films set in Hong Kong
Films shot in Hong Kong
1990s Hong Kong films